Cullen Sawtelle (September 25, 1805 – November 10, 1887) was an American attorney and politician from Maine. He was most notable for his service as a U.S. Representative from 1845 to 1847 and 1849 to 1851.

Biography
Sawtelle was born in Norridgewock, Massachusetts (now Maine) on September 25, 1805, a son of  Richard Sawtelle and Sarah "Sally" (Ware) Sawtelle. He received his early education under private tutors and in 1825 he graduated from Bowdoin College in Brunswick, Maine. He studied law with Charles Greene of Athens, Maine and Daniel Wells of Greenfield, Massachusetts, attained admission to the bar in 1828, and practiced in Norridgewock.

A Democrat in politics, he served as register of probate for Somerset County from 1830 to 1838. From 1843 to 1845, he was a member of the Maine Senate.

In 1844, Sawtelle was elected to represent Maine's 5th congressional district in the United States House of Representatives. He served in the 29th United States Congress (March 4, 1845 to March 3, 1847), and was chairman of the Committee on Revisal and Unfinished Business.

Sawtelle was elected to another term in 1848  and served in the 31st United States Congress March 4, 1849 to March 3, 1851. During his second term, Sawtelle was chairman of the Committee on Revolutionary Claims.

After leaving Congress, Sawtelle relocated to New York City, where he was an attorney and credit manager for several mercantile firms until he retired in 1882.

Sawtelle died in Englewood, New Jersey, November 10, 1887. He was interred in Brookside Cemetery in Englewood.

Family
In 1830, Sawtelle married Elizabeth Lyman (1809–1886). They were the parents of three children: Henrietta, Charles, and Catharine.

Their son Charles G. Sawtelle served as a brigadier general in the United States Army.

References

External links

Cullen Sawtelle at The Political Graveyard

1805 births
1887 deaths
Bowdoin College alumni
Democratic Party Maine state senators
People from Norridgewock, Maine
Democratic Party members of the United States House of Representatives from Maine
Burials at Brookside Cemetery (Englewood, New Jersey)
19th-century American politicians